This Is the Modern World is the second studio album by British band The Jam, released in November 1977. The album was released less than six months after their debut album In the City, and reached No. 22 on the UK Albums Chart.

Although generally met with negative reviews by music critics upon release, This Is the Modern World has been described as being an album "with far more light and shade" than In the City.

The only single from This Is the Modern World was the censored version of "The Modern World", which peaked at No. 36 on the UK Singles Chart.

Cover photography
The photography for the album was taken by Gered Mankowitz and David Redfern. The front cover depicts the band standing beneath London's Westway.

Track listing

Original US release
"The Modern World"
"All Around the World"
"I Need You (For Someone)"
"London Traffic" (Bruce Foxton)
"Standards"
"Life from a Window"
"In the Midnight Hour" (Steve Cropper, Wilson Pickett)
"In the Street, Today" (Paul Weller, Dave Waller)
"London Girl"
"Here Comes the Weekend"
"The Combine"
"Tonight at Noon"
"Don't Tell Them You're Sane" (Bruce Foxton)

The US release had a different track order, included the "censored" single version of "The Modern World", and added the single "All Around the World" which was released in the UK between their first two albums. "All Around the World" had been their biggest UK hit to date, peaking at No. 13, a placement they would not match until 1979 when "The Eton Rifles" peaked at No. 3. Thereafter, no domestically released single by The Jam would ever reach a peak position lower than No. 4.

Personnel
Credits are adapted from the album's liner notes.

The Jam
Paul Weller – vocals, guitar, harmonica
Bruce Foxton – bass guitar, vocals
Rick Buckler – drums

Technical
Vic Coppersmith-Heaven – production, engineering
Chris Parry – production
Hedgehog Design – artwork
Conny Jude – illustration
Bill Smith – art direction, design
Gered Mankowitz – front cover photography
David Redfern – back cover photography

Charts

Certifications

References

1977 albums
The Jam albums
Polydor Records albums